Crioprosopus nieti is a species of beetle in the family Cerambycidae. It was described by Chevrolat in 1875.

References

Trachyderini
Beetles described in 1875